Arıca may refer to:

People
 Erdoğan Arıca, Turkish football manager
 Soner Arıca, Turkish singer

Places
 Arıca, Gercüş, a village in the district of Gercüş, Batman Province, Turkey
 Arıca, Vezirköprü, a village in the district of Vezirköprü, Samsun Province, Turkey

Turkish-language surnames